El Mareny de Barraquetes is a village in Valencia, Spain. It is part of the municipality of Sueca.

Towns in Spain
Populated places in the Province of Valencia